Kreitzerisen  is a glacier,  long, flowing north between the Tertene Nunataks and Bamse Mountain in the Sør Rondane Mountains of Antarctica. It was mapped by Norwegian cartographers in 1957 from air photos taken by U.S. Navy Operation Highjump, 1946–47, and named for Lieutenant William R. Kreitzer, U.S. Navy, plane commander on one of the three Operation Highjump aerial crews which photographed this and other coastal areas between 14°E and 164°E.

See also
 List of glaciers in the Antarctic
 Glaciology

References

 

Glaciers of Queen Maud Land
Princess Ragnhild Coast